Korea Armed Forces Athletic Corps, commonly known as the Sangmu, is the sports division of the Republic of Korea Armed Forces. Its headquarters are located in Mungyeong, Gyeongsangbuk-do. It was founded in 1984 by the integration of the athletic teams of ROK Army, ROK Navy and ROK Air Force.

Composition

First Athletic Unit
 Football — Gimcheon Sangmu FC take part in K League
 Basketball — Sangmu Basketball Team take part in Korean Basketball League's Reserve League
 Handball — Sangmu Phoenix take part in Handball Korea League
 Rugby
 Boxing
 Judo
 Wrestling

Second Athletic Unit
 Baseball — Sangmu Baseball Team take part in Futures League (Korea Professional Baseball's Reserve League)
 Volleyball — Sangmu Volleyball Team took part in V-League
 Badminton
 Tennis
 Field hockey
 Gymnastics
 Weightlifting
 Table tennis

Third Athletic Unit
 Women's football — Busan Sangmu WFC take part in WK-League
 Taekwondo
 Shooting
 Aquatics
 Archery
 Fencing
 Athletics
 Cycling
 Biathlon
 Modern pentathlon

Achievements
Military World Games

Role in professional sports
Besides providing athletic training and facilities to serving active-duty military personnel, Sangmu also accepts qualified male professional athletes serving their mandatory military service. Athletes from team sports play for the Sangmu teams on loan from their parent club and return to their respective clubs at the end of their service. Serving Sangmu athletes may be temporarily released to participate in international competitions if called up by their respective sporting associations.

Applicants submit the appropriate documents towards the end of their playing season, which differs depending on the sport, and accepted applicants are further screened through a series of physical fitness tests and a written test. Athletes from team sports are also chosen based on availability of places in the team for the upcoming season and their past records. Those rejected may either re-apply (if not of maximum age yet) or serve as a regular soldier. Qualified applicants undergo five weeks of basic military training like all other recruits before being assigned to their respective athletic units. Due to their military status, Sangmu athletes are required to salute when the national anthem is played and are referred to as their rank instead of the honorific for athletes (seonsu, 선수) even at international competitions and tournaments.

The existing policy dictates that athletes who have not completed their service and win a gold medal at the Asian Games or at least a bronze medal at the Olympics may be exempted, although they still have to undergo basic training. If the athlete is already serving, he may be granted an early discharge, as in the case of basketball player Oh Se-keun and fencer Kim Jun-ho, both of whom were discharged weeks after winning their respective medals. Due to this policy, the topic of mandatory military service and exemptions garners increased public interest during the Olympics and Asian Games.

References

External links
 Korea Armed Forces Athletic Corps 
 Official Facebook 

 
Military of South Korea
Multi-sport clubs in South Korea
Military sports clubs
1984 establishments in South Korea